Daniil Aleksandrovich Lopatin (born 20 December 2000) is a Russian footballer who plays for FC Dynamo Bryansk.

Club career
He made his debut in the Russian Football National League for FC Spartak-2 Moscow on 8 September 2018 in a game against FC Nizhny Novgorod.

References

External links
 
 Profile by Russian Football National League

2000 births
Sportspeople from Izhevsk
Living people
Russian footballers
Russia youth international footballers
Association football forwards
FC Spartak-2 Moscow players
FC Veles Moscow players
FC KAMAZ Naberezhnye Chelny players
FC Dynamo Bryansk players
Russian First League players
Russian Second League players